Hydroporus notabilis is a species of predaceous diving beetle in the family Dytiscidae. It is found in North America and the Palearctic.

Subspecies
These two subspecies belong to the species Hydroporus notabilis:
 Hydroporus notabilis arcticus Thomson, 1856
 Hydroporus notabilis notabilis

References

Further reading

 
 

Dytiscidae
Articles created by Qbugbot
Beetles described in 1850